The IRIS (Information Systems Research in Scandinavia) Association is a non-profit organization aiming to promote research and research education in the use, development and management of information systems in Scandinavia, and making that research known in the international research community and among practitioners. The IRIS association publishes the Scandinavian Journal of Information Systems (SJIS) and holds the IRIS Conference as well as the  Scandinavian Conference on Information Systems Conference (SCIS). Its current president is Judith Molka-Danielsen (2011-2013).

IRIS Conferences 
In 1978 the IRIS started holding annual conferences and is the oldest consecutive IS conference in the world. The conference is organized as an annual working seminar for Scandinavian researchers and PhD students. After its first few meetings in Finland, the locations now alternate between different Scandinavian countries. Among the subjects discussed at the IRIS conferences is Information and Communications Technology, Business Process Management and Participatory Design. 
In 2005 IRIS had a steering committee, the chairman of which was Jan Pries-Heje.

In 2006 Judith Molka-Danielsen, and her associates published a paper that identified the most prolific authors who had successfully submitted papers to IRIS. The top ten researchers were: Lars Mathiassen, Markku Nurminen, Pertti Järvinen, Carsten Sørensen, Per Flensburg, Karl Heinz Kautz, Peter Axel Nielsen, Lars Svensson, Urban Nuldén, and Ole Hanseth.

The next IRIS conference will be held in Oulu, Finland, in August 2015.

Past Conference Locations 
2014: IRIS37 Ringsted, Denmark
2013: IRIS36 Gran, Norway
2012: IRIS35 Sigtuna, Sweden
2011: IRIS34 Turku, Finland
2010: IRIS33 Comwell Rebild Bakker, Denmark
2009: IRIS32 Molde, Norway
2008: IRIS31 Åre, Sweden
2007: IRIS30 Tampere, Finland
2006: IRIS29 Helsingør, Denmark
2005: IRIS28 Kristiansand, Norway
2004: IRIS27 Falkenberg, Sweden
2003: IRIS26 Porvoo, Finland
2002: IRIS25 Bautahøj, Denmark
2001: IRIS24 Bergen, Norway
2000: IRIS23 Uddevalla, Sweden
1999: IRIS22 Keuruu, Finland
1998: IRIS21 Sæby, Denmark
1997: IRIS20 Hankø, Norway
1996: IRIS19 Lökeberg, Sweden
1995: IRIS18 Gjern, Denmark
1994: IRIS17 Syöte, Finland
1993: IRIS16 Copenhagen, Denmark
1992: IRIS15 Larkollen, Norway
1991: IRIS14 Umeå-Lövånger, Sweden
1990: IRIS13 Turku, Finland
1989: IRIS12 Skagen, Denmark
1988: IRIS11 Røros, Norway
1987: IRIS10 Tampere, Finland
1986: IRIS9 Lund, Sweden
1985: IRIS8 Århus, Denmark
1984: IRIS7 Helsinki, Finland
1983: IRIS6 Øystese, Norway
1982: IRIS5 Stockholm, Sweden
1981: IRIS4 Oulu, Finland
1980: IRIS3 Saarijärvi, Finland
1979: IRIS2 Dragsfjärd, Finland
1978: IRIS1 Tampere, Finland

See also 
 Information Systems Research
 University of Turku
 Roskilde University

References

External links
 

Scandinavia
Computer science conferences
Information systems conferences